A halberd (also called halbard, halbert or Swiss voulge) is a two-handed pole weapon that came to prominent use during the 13th, 14th, 15th, and 16th centuries. The halberd consists of an axe blade topped with a spike mounted on a long shaft. It can have a hook or thorn on the back side of the axe blade for grappling mounted combatants. The halberd was usually 1.5 to 1.8 metres (5 to 6 feet) long.

The word halberd is cognate with the German word Hellebarde, deriving from Middle High German halm (handle) and barte (battleaxe) joined to form helmbarte. Troops that used the weapon were called halberdiers. The word has also been used to describe a weapon of the Early Bronze Age in Western Europe. This consisted of a blade mounted on a pole at a right angle.

History

The halberd is first mentioned (as ) in a work by 13th-century German poet Konrad von Würzburg. John of Winterthur described it as a new weapon used by the Swiss at the Battle of Morgarten of 1315. The halberd was inexpensive to produce and very versatile in battle. As the halberd was eventually refined, its point was more fully developed to allow it to better deal with spears and pikes (and make it able to push back approaching horsemen), as was the hook opposite the axe head, which could be used to pull horsemen to the ground. A Swiss peasant used a halberd to kill Charles the Bold, the Duke of Burgundy, at the Battle of Nancy, decisively ending the Burgundian Wars. Researchers suspect that a halberd or a bill sliced through the back of King Richard III's skull at the Battle of Bosworth.

The halberd was the primary weapon of the early Swiss armies in the 14th and early 15th centuries. Later, the Swiss added the pike to better repel knightly attacks and roll over enemy infantry formations, with the halberd, hand-and-a-half sword, or the dagger known as the Schweizerdolch used for closer combat. The German Landsknechte, who imitated Swiss warfare methods, also used the pike, supplemented by the halberd—but their side arm of choice was a short sword called the Katzbalger.

As long as pikemen fought other pikemen, the halberd remained a useful supplemental weapon for push of pike, but when their position became more defensive, to protect the slow-loading arquebusiers and matchlock musketeers from sudden attacks by cavalry, the percentage of halberdiers in the pike units steadily decreased.  By 1588, official Dutch infantry composition was down to 39% arquebuses, 34% pikes, 13% muskets, 9% halberds, and 2% one-handed swords. By 1600, troops armed exclusively with swords were no longer used and the halberd was only used by sergeants.Olaf van Nimwegen. "The Dutch Army and the Military Revolutions, 1588-1688," Boydell: 2010. Page 87. 

While rarer than it had been from the late 15th to mid 16th centuries, the halberd was still used infrequently as an infantry weapon well into the mid 17th century. The armies of the Catholic League in 1625, for example, had halberdiers comprising 7% of infantry units, with musketeers comprising 58% and armored pikemen 35%. By 1627 this had changed to 65% muskets, 20% pikes, and 15% halberds. A near-contemporary depiction of the 1665 Battle of Montes Claros at Palace of the Marquises of Fronteira depicts a minority of the Portuguese and Spanish soldiers as armed with halberds. Antonio de Pereda's 1635 painting El Socorro a Génova depicting the Relief of Genoa has all the soldiers armed with halberds. The most consistent users of the halberd in the Thirty Years War were German sergeants who would carry one as a sign of rank. While they could use them in melee combat, more often they were used for dressing the ranks by grasping the shaft in both hands and pushing it against several men simultaneously. They could also be used to push pikes or muskets up or down, especially to stop overexcited musketeers from firing prematurely.Wilson, Peter (2009). Europe's Tragedy: A History of the Thirty Years War. Allen Lane. Page 95. 

The halberd has been used as a court bodyguard weapon for centuries, and is still the ceremonial weapon of the Swiss Guard in the Vatican and the Alabarderos (Halberdiers) Company
of the Spanish Royal Guard. The halberd was one of the polearms sometimes carried by lower-ranking officers in European infantry units in the 16th through 18th centuries. In the British army, sergeants continued to carry halberds until 1793, when they were replaced by spontoons. The 18th century halberd had, however, become simply a symbol of rank with no sharpened edge and insufficient strength to use as a weapon. It served as an instrument for ensuring that infantrymen in ranks stood correctly aligned with each other and that their muskets were aimed at the correct level.

The development of the halberd 

The word helmbarte or variations thereof show up in german texts from the 13th century onwards. At that point, the halberd is not too distinct from other types of broad axes or bardiches used all over Europe. In the late 13th century the weapon starts to develop into a distinct weapon, with the top of the blade developing into a more acute thrusting point. This form of the halberd is errorenously sometimes called a voulge or a swiss voulge, but there's no evidence for the usage of these terms for this weapon historically. There were variations of these weapons with spikes on the back, though also plenty without. In the early 15th century the construction changes to incorporate sockets into the blade, instead of hoops as the previous designs had. With this development back spikes are directly integrated into the blade construction and become a universal part of the halberd design.

Similar and related polearms 

Bardiche, a type of two-handed battle axe known in the 16th and 17th centuries in Eastern Europe
Bill, similar to a halberd but with a hooked blade form
Ge or dagger-axe, a Chinese weapon in use from the Shang dynasty (est. 1500 BC) that had a dagger-shaped blade mounted perpendicular to a spearhead
Fauchard, a curved blade atop a  pole that was used in Europe between the 11th and 14th centuries
Guisarme, a medieval bladed weapon on the end of a long pole; later designs implemented a small reverse spike on the back of the blade
Guandao, a Chinese polearm from the 3rd century AD that had a heavy curved blade with a spike at the back
Ji (戟), a Chinese polearm combining a spear and dagger-axe
Kamayari, a Japanese spear with blade offshoots
Lochaber axe, a Scottish weapon that had a heavy blade attached to a pole in a similar fashion to a voulge
Partisan, a large double-bladed spearhead mounted on a long shaft that had protrusions on either side for parrying sword thrusts
Pollaxe, an axe or hammer mounted on a long shaft—developed in the 14th century to breach the plate armour worn increasingly by European men-at-arms
Ranseur, a pole weapon consisting of a spear-tip affixed with a cross hilt at its base derived from the earlier spetum
Spontoon, a 17th-century weapon that consisted of a large blade with two side blades mounted on a long  pole, considered a more elaborate pike
Voulge, a crude single-edged blade bound to a wooden shaft
Tabar, a type of battle axe
War scythe, an improvised weapon that consisted of a blade from a scythe attached vertically to a shaft
Welsh hook, similar to a halberd and thought to originate from a forest-bill
Woldo, A Korean polearm that had a crescent-shaped blade mounted on a long shaft, similar in construction to the Chinese guandao, and primarily served as a symbol of the Royal Guard
Yue, a Chinese axe with long shaft.

Gallery

See also
 Dagger-axe
 Naginata 
 Viking halberd

References

Bibliography
 Brandtherm, Dirk & O'Flaherty, Ronan; Prodigal sons: two 'halberds' in the Hunt Museum, Limerick, from Cuenca, Spain and Beyrǔt, Syria, pp. 56–60, JRSAI Vol.131 (2001). .
 
 O'Flaherty, Ronan; The Early Bronze Age halberd: a history of research and a brief guide to the sources, pp. 74–94, Journal of the Royal Society of Antiquaries of Ireland, Vol.128 (1998).
R. E. Oakeshott, European weapons and armour: From the Renaissance to the industrial revolution (1980), 44–48.

External links

 Halberds at the Philadelphia Museum of Art
 Halberds at the Metropolitan Museum of Art
 Halberds at the University of Michigan Museum of Art

Medieval blade weapons
Medieval polearms
Polearms
Renaissance-era polearms
Axes